The Pahoturi, or Paho River, is a river in southwestern Papua New Guinea.

See also
List of rivers of Papua New Guinea
Pahoturi languages

References

Rivers of Papua New Guinea